Tabea Zimmermann (born 8 October 1966) is a German violist.

Born in Lahr, Zimmermann began learning the viola at age three, and commenced piano studies at age five. At age 13, she studied viola with Ulrich Koch at the Conservatory of Freiburg and progressed to study with Sándor Végh at the Mozarteum University of Salzburg. She soon gained notice in international competitions, winning first prizes in Geneva (1982), Budapest (1984), and the Maurice Vieux International Viola Competition in Paris (1983), for which she was awarded an instrument by contemporary luthier Étienne Vatelot (1980). Since 2019, she has been playing an instrument built for her by Patrick Robin. 

As a soloist, Zimmermann has performed with the Leipzig Gewandhaus Orchestra, the Berlin Philharmonic Orchestra, the BBC Philharmonic, the Orchestre de la Suisse Romande, and other major orchestras, and under Kurt Masur, Bernard Haitink, Christoph Eschenbach, Nikolaus Harnoncourt, and other conductors. In the spring of 2022, she was the artist-in-residence of the Helsinki Philharmonic.

Zimmermann is also involved in chamber music, having performed with Gidon Kremer, Heinz Holliger, Hartmut Höll, Steven Isserlis, Javier Perianes, and Pamela Frank at numerous festivals.

Committed to 20th- and 21st-century repertoire, Zimmermann has attained noted success performing the Sonata for Solo Viola written for her by György Ligeti, premiering it in 1994. Other contemporary composers who have written works for her include Heinz Holliger, Wolfgang Rihm, Georges Lentz, Bruno Mantovani, Sally Beamish, Enno Poppe and Josef Tal.

Since 2002, Zimmermann has been a professor of viola and chamber music at the Hanns Eisler Academy of Music in Berlin. Previously she was on the faculty of the Saarbrücken Music Academy (1987–1989) and the Frankfurt University of Music and Performing Arts (1994–2002). Her artistic achievements and contributions have garnered her numerous national and international awards, including the Ernst von Siemens Music Prize, Frankfurter Musikpreis, the Hessian Cultural Prize, and the International Prize of the Chigiana Music Academy of Siena.

Zimmermann is the widow of conductor  (1950–2000). Her second husband was the American conductor Steven Sloane. She has three children.

She lives in Berlin.

Selected recordings 

 Hector Berlioz, Harold en Italie, Tabea Zimmerman, alto, Les Siècles, conducted by François Xavier Roth. CD Erato Warner classics 2022.

References

Further reading

External links 
 

German classical violists
Women violists
1966 births
Living people
People from Lahr
Maurice Vieux International Viola Competition prize-winners
Contemporary classical music performers
Hochschule für Musik Freiburg alumni
Winners of the Geneva International Music Competition
Officers Crosses of the Order of Merit of the Federal Republic of Germany
Recipients of the Order of Merit of Baden-Württemberg
Ernst von Siemens Music Prize winners
Academic staff of the Hochschule für Musik Hanns Eisler Berlin
20th-century German musicians
20th-century German women musicians
20th-century classical musicians
21st-century German musicians
21st-century German women musicians
21st-century classical musicians
20th-century violists
21st-century violists